The Sixth Sense is a 1999 American psychological thriller film written and directed by M. Night Shyamalan. It stars Bruce Willis as a child psychologist whose patient (Haley Joel Osment) claims he can see and talk to the dead.

Released by Buena Vista Pictures (through its Hollywood Pictures label) on August 6, 1999, critics praised its performances (particularly those of Willis, Osment, and Toni Collette), atmosphere, direction and twist ending. It was nominated for six Academy Awards, including Best Picture, Best Director and Best Original Screenplay for Shyamalan, Best Supporting Actor for Osment, and Best Supporting Actress for Collette. The film established Shyamalan as a predominant thriller screenwriter/director and introduced the cinema public to his traits, most notably his affinity for surprise endings.

It was the second-highest-grossing film of 1999, taking about $293 million in the US and $379 million in other markets.

Plot 
Philadelphia-based child psychologist Malcolm Crowe returns home with his wife, Anna, after having been honored for his work. Vincent Grey, a former patient Malcolm had treated for hallucinations, breaks into their house and accuses Malcolm of failing him before shooting Malcolm and then himself.

Months later, Malcolm begins working with Cole Sear, a 9-year-old boy who reminds him of Vincent. He feels he must help Cole to rectify his failure to help Vincent and reconcile with Anna, who has become distant and cold. Cole's mother, Lynn, worries about his social skills, especially after seeing signs of physical harm. At a birthday party, Cole is cornered by bullies who lock him in a cupboard, causing him to scream in terror before passing out. Following this incident, Cole finally confides to Malcolm that he sees ghosts walking around like the living, but they only see what they want to see and are unaware that they are dead.

Malcolm thinks Cole is delusional and considers dropping his case, but after listening to an audiotape from a session with Vincent, he hears a man tearfully begging for help in Spanish and realizes that the ghosts Cole sees are real. He suggests that Cole try to communicate with the ghosts and help them finish their business, to which Cole hesitantly agrees.

Cole awakens one night to discover a ghost girl vomiting. He finds out who she is and goes with Malcolm to the funeral reception at her home. Cole sneaks into the girl's room, where she crawls out from under her bed and gives him a box containing a videotape, which he gives to her father. The tape reveals the girl's mother poisoning her food, alerting her father to this and saving her younger sister from the same fate.

Learning not to be afraid of the ghosts he sees, Cole begins to fit in at school and is cast as the lead in the school play, with the ghost of a dead teacher helping coach him. He delivers an outstanding performance with Malcolm looking on. Before parting ways with Malcolm, Cole suggests that he try speaking to Anna while she is asleep to communicate better with her.

While stuck in traffic, Cole tells his mother his secret and says that someone died in an accident down the road. When Lynn does not believe him, Cole tells her his late grandmother visits him and describes how she saw Lynn in a dance performance when she was a child, giving details that he could not have known. Cole's mother finally accepts the fact that her son has a special ability and tearfully embraces him.

Malcolm returns home to find Anna talking in her sleep, asking Malcolm why he left her, much to his confusion. When she suddenly drops Malcolm's wedding ring, he notices that it is not on his finger. Recalling what Cole told him about dead people only seeing what they want to see and not knowing they are dead, Malcolm finally realizes he did not survive being shot by Vincent and has been dead while working with Cole. He quickly comes to terms with his death and tells Anna that he loves her. She bids him goodnight, indicating that she is now at peace and can move on. With his business finally complete, Malcolm's spirit departs in a flash of light.

Cast

Production 

David Vogel, then-president of production of Walt Disney Studios, read Shyamalan's spec script and loved it. Without obtaining corporate approval, Vogel bought the rights, despite the price of $3 million and the stipulation that Shyamalan could direct the film. Disney dismissed Vogel from his position at the studio, and Vogel left the company shortly thereafter. Disney sold the production rights to Spyglass Entertainment, while retaining the distribution rights and 12.5% of the film's box office takings.

During the casting process for the role of Cole Sear, Shyamalan had been apprehensive about Osment's video audition, saying later he was "this really sweet cherub, kind of beautiful, blond boy". Shyamalan saw the role as darker and more brooding but felt that Osment "nailed it with the vulnerability and the need ... He was able to convey a need as a human being in a way that was amazing to see."

Willis was cast in the role of Malcolm Crowe as part of a deal to compensate the studio for Willis's role in the implosion of Broadway Brawler the year before.

The color red is absent from most of the film, but it is used prominently in a few isolated shots for "anything in the real world that has been tainted by the other world" and "to connote really explosively emotional moments and situations". Examples include the door of the church where Cole seeks sanctuary; the balloon, carpet, and Cole's sweater at the birthday party; the tent in which he first encounters Kyra; the volume numbers on Crowe's tape recorder; the doorknob on the locked basement door where Malcolm's office is located; the shirt that Anna wears at the restaurant; Kyra's mother's dress at the wake; and the shawl wrapped around the sleeping Anna.

All the clothes Malcolm wears are items he wore or touched the evening before his death, including his overcoat, his blue rowing sweatshirt and the different layers of his suit. Though the filmmakers were careful about clues of Malcolm's true state, the camera zooms slowly towards his face when Cole says, "I see dead people." The filmmakers initially feared this would be too much of a giveaway, but left it in.

Location filming took place mostly in streets and buildings of Philadelphia, notable at St. Augustine's Church on 4th and New Streets in Old City and on Saint Albans Street in Southwest Center City.

Marisa Tomei was considered for the role of Lynn Sear.

Michael Cera auditioned for the role of Cole Sear, and Liam Aiken was offered the role but turned it down.

Release

Home media 
After a six-month online promotion campaign, The Sixth Sense was released on VHS and DVD by Hollywood Pictures Home Video on March 28, 2000. It went on to become the top-selling DVD of 2000, with more than 2.5 million units shipped, and the all-time second best-selling DVD title up until then, as well as the top video rental title of all-time. The film generated at least  from the US home video market, including  from VHS rentals in the US.

In the United Kingdom, it was the third-most-watched film of 2003 on television, with  viewers that year.

Reception

Box office 
The Sixth Sense had a production budget of approximately $40 million (plus $25 million for prints and advertising). During its opening weekend, the film grossed $26.6 million, making it the largest August opening weekend, surpassing The Fugitive (1993). It would go on to hold this record for two years until it was taken by Rush Hour 2 in 2001. The film spent five weeks as the number 1 film at the U.S. box office, becoming only the second film, after Titanic (1997), to have grossed more than $20 million a weekend for five weekends. With a total gross of $29.2 million, The Sixth Sense would hold the record for having the largest Labor Day weekend gross until 2007 when it was surpassed by Halloween. During Labor Day, it made $6.3 million, making it the biggest September Monday gross, holding that record until it was beaten by It in 2017. It earned $293,506,292 in the United States and Canada and a worldwide gross of $672,806,292, ranking it 74th on the list of worldwide box-office money earners as of May 2022 when adjusting for inflation. Box Office Mojo estimates that the film sold over 57.5 million tickets in the US.

In Europe, the film sold 37,124,510 tickets at the box office. In the United Kingdom, it was given at first a limited release on nine screens, and entered at No. 8 before climbing up to No. 1 the next week with 430 theatres playing the film. It had a record opening in the Netherlands.

Critical response 

The Sixth Sense received positive reviews; Osment in particular was widely praised for his performance. On the review aggregator website, Rotten Tomatoes, the film has an approval rating of 86% based on reviews from 158 critics, with an average rating of 7.70/10. The site's critical consensus reads: "M. Night Shyamalan's The Sixth Sense is a twisty ghost story with all the style of a classical Hollywood picture, but all the chills of a modern horror flick." Metacritic rated it 64 out of 100 based on 35 reviews, meaning "generally favorable reviews". Audiences polled by CinemaScore gave the film an average grade of "A−" on an A+ to F scale. 

By vote of the members of the Science Fiction and Fantasy Writers of America, The Sixth Sense was awarded the Nebula Award for Best Script during 1999. The film was No. 71 on Bravo's 100 Scariest Movie Moments, for the scene where Cole encounters a female ghost in his tent. It was named the 89th best American film of all time in a 2007 poll by the American Film Institute.

The line "I see dead people" from the film became a popular catchphrase after its release, scoring No. 44 on AFI's 100 Years...100 Movie Quotes.

The Sixth Sense also scored 60th place on AFI's 100 Years...100 Thrills, honoring America's most "heart pounding movies".

Accolades 

The Sixth Sense has received numerous awards and nominations, with Academy Award nomination categories ranging from those honoring the film itself (Best Picture), to its writing, editing, and direction (Best Director, Best Editing, and Best Original Screenplay), to its cast's performance (Best Supporting Actor and Best Supporting Actress). Especially lauded was the supporting role of actor Haley Joel Osment, whose nominations include an Academy Award, a Broadcast Film Critics Association Award, and a Golden Globe Award. Overall, The Sixth Sense was nominated for six Academy Awards and four British Academy Film Awards, but won none. The film received three nominations from the People's Choice Awards and won all of them, with lead actor Bruce Willis being honored for his role. The Satellite Awards nominated the film in four categories, with awards being received for writing (M. Night Shyamalan) and editing (Andrew Mondshein). Supporting actress Toni Collette was nominated for both an Academy Award and a Satellite award for her role in the film. James Newton Howard was honored by the American Society of Composers, Authors and Publishers for his composition of the music for the film.

In 2013, the Writers Guild of America ranked the screenplay #50 on its list of 101 Greatest Screenplays ever written.

Year-end lists 
AFI's 100 Years...100 Thrills – No. 60
AFI's 100 Years...100 Movie Quotes:
"I see dead people." – No. 44
AFI's 100 Years...100 Movies (10th Anniversary Edition) – No. 89

See also 
List of ghost films

References

External links 

 
 
 
 

1990s ghost films
American psychological horror films
1990s psychological thriller films
1990s thriller drama films
1999 films
American ghost films
American nonlinear narrative films
American psychological drama films
American psychological thriller films
American supernatural horror films
American thriller drama films
Filicide in fiction
Films about death
Films about psychiatry
Films about psychic powers
Films about the afterlife
Films directed by M. Night Shyamalan
Films produced by Barry Mendel
Films produced by Frank Marshall
Films produced by Kathleen Kennedy
Films scored by James Newton Howard
Films set in 1998
Films set in Philadelphia
Films shot in Philadelphia
Films with screenplays by M. Night Shyamalan
Hollywood Pictures films
The Kennedy/Marshall Company films
Murder–suicide in films
Nebula Award for Best Script-winning works
Poisoning in film
Spyglass Entertainment films
Supernatural drama films
1999 drama films
Films about mother–son relationships
1990s English-language films
1990s American films